Holoman–Outland House is a historic home located near Rich Square, Northampton County, North Carolina. It was built in 1920, and is a two-story, Colonial Revival / American Foursquare style brick dwelling with a one-story kitchen wing.  It has a hipped roof with hipped dormer, full-width one-story front porch with Doric order columns, porte-cochère, and a two-level squared bay with a modified Palladian window.  Also on the property are the contributing cow shed (1920) and pump house and smokehouse (1920).

It was listed on the National Register of Historic Places in 2001.

Notes

References

Houses on the National Register of Historic Places in North Carolina
Colonial Revival architecture in North Carolina
Houses completed in 1920
Houses in Northampton County, North Carolina
National Register of Historic Places in Northampton County, North Carolina